E. Kumaril Swamy (24 November 1924 – 9 December 1993) was an Indian painter and teacher.

Biography
E. Kumaril Swamy was born in a small village Mulkanoor, Karim Nagar district, near Hyderabad on 24 November 1924. He studied Hindi literature, 1940. He obtained a Diploma in Painting (Fine Art) from Sharda Ukil School of Art, Delhi, 1944, and a degree in Painting (Fine Art) from Visav  Bharati University, Shanti Niketan, 1949. He studied under Sharda Sharn Ukil and  Nandalal Bose.

In his early teens, he started doing social work in slums of Hyderabad. Thakkar Bapa (an Indian social worker) saw his ability and took him to Delhi and introduced to Mahatma Gandhi as a young freedom fighter. He worked with Mahatma Gandhi and Thakkar Bapa in National Independent Movement.

His further education was started at Gandhi Ashram, also boys hostel, known as Udyog Shala (present days polytechnics) at Kingsway Camp, Delhi. 
Here his education was under a very prominent Hindi Sahityakar and Gandhian Social worker and reformer, Hariprasad Dvivedi, popularly known as Viyogi Hari. 
Kumaril Swamy's ability as writer was kindled by his sahityakar guru Viyogi Hari, whose teachings and knowledge reformed the life of young artist. 

His medium of expression was mainly water colour and oil colours also. 
His water colours were Organic Earth Colours (earthy pigments excavated from mines) came in dried cake forms. He used to crush them as powder and mixed water to make his medium of expression, Water Colours.

He had great love and attraction for Murals and Fresco paintings. He was fascinated by the great work done in Ajanta and Elora caves. One of his great fresco painting is in Shanti Niketan, a huge painting which mesmerized the viewers, is a replica of Ajanta mural called 'Bodhisattav Padmapani'.

He visited several European countries. 

He joined College of Art, Delhi in 1961 as a Lecturer and was retained as professor of Fine Art and Vice-Principal (Evening) in 1982. He held the posts of honorary Principal, Sharda Ukil School of Art, New Delhi and Vice President of The Indian Art Association, New Delhi. He was a member of the National Committee for India of the International Association of Art (UNESCO), Paris, and was president of the Society for Promotion of Yoga and Tantra (SOYOTAN), New Delhi.

Exhibitions
His work was regularly displayed in important centres in India and abroad, and appeared in three one-man shows and many group shows and in sixteen state level exhibitions, six national exhibitions, and ten international exhibitions.

Honours and awards
 World Telugu Conference, 1975 honoured as a distinguished artist and social worker.
 Sahitya Kala Parishad Honour, 1977.
 International Award (first time to India) by the Government of Bulgaria for international Art Competition on "Humour and Satire", 1977.
 Visited Bulgaria on invitation as a distinguished guest at the Sixth International Bi-annual Festival of Humour and Satire in Arts, 1983.
 Author of a book - "BHARTIYA KALA AUR KALAKAR" published by Publications Division, New Delhi.
 Awarded Fellowship from Indian Council for Historical Research (ICHR), New Delhi for a book on Desist Veteran Artists –"KALA KE SAADHAK".
 All India Fine Arts & Craft Society (AIFACS), New Delhi honoured as Veteran Artist, for his contribution to Art, 1988.

Paintings and collections
The work of Kumaril Swamy can be found in National Gallery of Modern Art, Lalit Kala Academy (Delhi), Chandighar Museum, Birla Museum, Russian Museum, Sahitya Kala Parishad, Ambassador of Korea, Govt. of Sri Lanka, Museum of Humor and Satire (Bulgaria), Sri Ghansham Das Birla, Hyderabad Museum, Lalit Kala Academy (A.P.), College of Art (Delhi), Salarjung museum (Hyderabad), Sangaria Museum (Jaipur), Shanti Niketan Museum, Shri Dharma Vira, ICS, Govt. of India (Education Ministry), D.C.M. and several personal collections in India and abroad.

Publications
Articles about Kumaril Swamy and reproductions of his paintings have been published in Indian newspapers, magazines, books and journals including Saptahik Hindustan, Dainik Hindustan, Nav Bharat Times, Dharamyug, Akash Vani, Soviet Land, Navneet, Jeevan Sahitya, Dinmaan, Aajkal, Congress (Hindi & English), Sandesh, Samaaj, Telugu Bharti, Andhra Prabha, Andhra Patrika, Andhra Jyoti, Gyanoday, Aaj, Pratika, Samavet Swar, Aadhar.

References

External links

1924 births
1993 deaths
20th-century Indian painters
Indian art educators
Painters from Andhra Pradesh
People from Karimnagar district